The Snell envelope, used in stochastics and mathematical finance, is the smallest supermartingale dominating a stochastic process.  The Snell envelope is named after James Laurie Snell.

Definition 
  is a -supermartingale
  dominates , i.e.  -almost surely for all times 
 If  is a -supermartingale which dominates , then  dominates .

Construction 

 for 
where  is the join (in this case equal to the maximum of the two random variables).

Application 
 If  is a discounted American option payoff with Snell envelope  then  is the minimal capital requirement to hedge  from time  to the expiration date.

References 

Mathematical finance